Ministry of Natural Resources may refer to:

 Minister of Natural Resources (Canada)
 Ministry of Natural Resources (China)
 Ministry of Natural Resources (Ontario)
 Ministry of Natural Resources (Somalia)
 Ministry of Natural Resources and Environment (Russia)
 Ministry of Natural Resources and Environment (Thailand)
 Ministry of Natural Resources and Wildlife (Quebec)
 Ministry of Natural Resources and Tourism (Tanzania)
 Ministry of Natural Resources and Environment (Malaysia)

It may also refer to:
 Ministry for the Environment and Natural Resources (Iceland)
 Ministry of Ecology and Natural Resources (Azerbaijan)
 Ministry of Energy and Natural Resources (Georgia)
 Ministry of Energy and Natural Resources (Turkey)
 Ministry of Environment Protection and Natural Resources (Georgia)
 Ministry of the Environment and Natural Resources (Nicaragua)
 Rivers State Ministry of Energy and Natural Resources
 Venezuelan Ministry of Environment and Natural Resources

See also 
 List of environmental ministries

Δ